A speaker terminal is a type of electrical connector often used for interconnecting speakers and audio power amplifiers.

The terminals are used in pairs with each of the speaker cable's two wires being connected to one terminal in the pair.  Since speaker connections are polarized, the terminals are typically color-coded so that the positive wire connects to the red and the negative to the black terminal.

The terminal consists of a spring-loaded metallic pincher that opens when the lever is pressed, and when released will tightly grip the conductor which has been inserted into it.  This type of terminal is popular because it does not require any special connector to be applied to the end of the wire; instead, the wire is simply stripped of insulation on its end and inserted into the terminal.  This terminal may be used with a variety of wire gauges as well as with either solid core or stranded wires.

DIY projects sometimes reuse speaker terminals for other applications using bare wire leads.

See also
Banana connector
Binding post

References

Audiovisual connectors
Sound production technology